This article is a list of commands of the United States Navy.

The list is organized along administrative chains of command (CoC), and does not include the CNO's office or shore establishments.

Deployable/operational U.S. Navy units typically have two chains of command the operational chain and the administrative chain.

Operational CoCs change quite often based on a unit's location and current mission.  For example,  is always administratively assigned to Commander, Naval Air Force, Atlantic Fleet (CNAL).  It might also be operationally assigned to CNAL early in its inter-deployment readiness cycle (IDRC). Before 2010, later in the IDRC, it would have been assigned to Commander, Second Fleet, which is responsible for Carrier Strike Group (CSG) training and operations on the east coast.

Once the CSG deploys and crosses over the inter-UCC boundary in the mid-Atlantic, it then reports (is "chopped") to the Sixth Fleet (responsible for European waters and the Mediterranean Sea).

Once the CSG enters the Suez Canal, it "chops" to the Fifth Fleet for operational control.

Operationally, the Roosevelt CSG chain of command is: Commander Fifth Fleet, Commander U.S. Naval Forces Central Command, Commander U.S. Central Command, United States Secretary of Defense, President of the United States.

United States Pacific Fleet (NS Pearl Harbor, HI)

United States Third Fleet (NB Point Loma, CA)

 USS Zumwalt (DDG-1000) (NB San Diego, CA)
 USS Michael Monsoor (DDG-1001) (NB San Diego, CA)

Carrier Strike Group 1 (CSG-1) (NB San Diego, CA) 
USS Carl Vinson (CVN-70) (NAS North Island, CA)
USS Lake Erie (CG-70)
USS Princeton (CG-59) 
Destroyer Squadron 1 (DESRON-1)
USS Howard (DDG-83)
USS Shoup (DDG-86)
USS Sterett (DDG-104)
USS Higgins (DDG-76)
USS O'Kane (DDG-77)
Carrier Air Wing 2 (CVW-2) (NAS Lemoore, CA)
Strike Fighter Squadron 2 (VFA-2)
Strike Fighter Squadron 113 (VFA-113)
Strike Fighter Squadron 147 (VFA-147)
Strike Fighter Squadron 192 (VFA-192)
Carrier Airborne Early Warning Squadron 113 (VAW-113) (NAS Point Mugu, CA)
Electronic Attack Squadron 136 (VAQ-136) (NAS Whidbey Island, WA)
 Fleet Logistics Support Squadron 30, Detachment 2 (VRC-30 Det. 2) (NAS North Island, CA)
Helicopter Sea Combat Squadron 4 (HSC-4) (NAS North Island, CA)
 Helicopter Maritime Strike Squadron 78 (HSM-78) (NAS North Island, CA)

Carrier Strike Group 3 (CSG-3) (NB San Diego, CA) 
USS Abraham Lincoln (CVN-72) (NAS North Island, CA)
USS Mobile Bay (CG-53) 
USS Lake Champlain (CG-57) 
Destroyer Squadron 21 (DESRON-21)
USS Dewey (DDG-105)
USS Spruance (DDG-111)
USS Decatur (DDG-73) 
USS Stockdale (DDG-106) 
USS Stethem (DDG-63) 

 Carrier Air Wing 9 (CVW-9) (NAS Lemoore, CA)
Strike Fighter Squadron 14 (VFA-14)
Strike Fighter Squadron 41 (VFA-41)
Marine Fighter Attack Squadron 314 (VMFA-314) (MCAS Miramar, CA)
Strike Fighter Squadron 151 (VFA-151)
Electronic Attack Squadron 133 (VAQ-133) (NAS Whidbey Island, WA)
Carrier Airborne Early Warning Squadron 117 (VAW-117) (NAS Point Mugu, CA)
Helicopter Sea Combat Squadron 14 (HSC-14) (NAS North Island, CA)
Helicopter Maritime Strike Squadron 71 (HSM-71) (NAS North Island, CA)
Fleet Logistics Support Squadron 30, Detachment 1 (VRC-30 Det. 1) (NAS North Island, CA)

Carrier Strike Group 9 (CSG-9) (NB San Diego, CA) 
 USS Theodore Roosevelt (CVN-71) (NAS North Island, CA)

USS Bunker Hill (CG-52)
USS Cape St. George (CG-71)
Destroyer Squadron 23 (DESRON-23)
USS Russell (DDG-59) 
USS Paul Hamilton (DDG-60)
USS Rafael Peralta (DDG-115)
USS Pinckney (DDG-91)
USS John Finn (DDG-113)
Carrier Air Wing 11 (CVW-11) (NAS Lemoore, CA)
Strike Fighter Squadron 154 (VFA-154)
Strike Fighter Squadron 31 (VFA-31)
Strike Fighter Squadron 146 (VFA-146)
Strike Fighter Squadron 87 (VFA-87)
Carrier Airborne Early Warning Squadron 115 (VAW-115) (NAS Point Mugu, CA)
Electronic Attack Squadron 142 (VAQ-142) (NAS Whidbey Island, CA)
Fleet Logistics Support Squadron 30, Detachment 3 (VRC-30 Det. 3) (NAS North Island, CA)
Helicopter Sea Combat Squadron 8 (HSC-8) (NAS North Island, CA)
 Helicopter Maritime Strike Squadron 75 (HSM-75) (NAS North Island, CA)

Carrier Strike Group 11 (CSG-11) (NS Everett, WA) 
USS Nimitz (CVN-68) (NB Kitsap–Bremerton, WA)
USS Chosin (CG-65) 
Destroyer Squadron 9 (DESRON-9)
USS Gridley (DDG-101)
USS Kidd (DDG-100) 
USS Momsen (DDG-92)
USS Ralph Johnson (DDG-114)
USS Sampson (DDG-102)
Carrier Air Wing 17 (CVW-17) (NAS Lemoore, CA)
Strike Fighter Squadron 22 (VFA-22)
Marine Fighter Attack Squadron 323 (VMFA-323) (MCAS Miramar, CA)
Strike Fighter Squadron 94 (VFA-94)
Strike Fighter Squadron 137 (VFA-137)
Electronic Attack Squadron 139 (VAQ-139) (NAS Whidbey Island, WA)
Carrier Airborne Early Warning Squadron 116 (VAW-116) (NAS Point Mugu, CA)
Helicopter Sea Combat Squadron 6 (HSC-6) (NAS North Island, CA)
Helicopter Maritime Strike Squadron 73 (HSM-73) (NAS North Island, CA)
Fleet Logistics Support Squadron 30, Detachment 4 (VRC-30 Det. 4) (NAS North Island, CA)

Naval Surface Group Middle Pacific (NS Pearl Harbor, HI) 
USS Port Royal (CG-73)

Destroyer Squadron 31 (DESRON-31)
USS Hopper (DDG-70)
USS Michael Murphy (DDG-112)
USS John Paul Jones (DDG-53)
USS Wayne E. Meyer (DDG-108) 
USS William P. Lawrence (DDG-110)
USS Chung-Hoon (DDG-93) 
USS Preble (DDG-88)
USS Halsey (DDG-97)
USS Chafee (DDG-90)

Expeditionary Strike Group 3 (ESG-3) (NB San Diego, CA) 

 USS Portland (LPD-27)
 USS John P. Murtha (LPD-26)
 USS Comstock (LSD-45)
 USS Harpers Ferry (LSD-49)
 USS Pearl Harbor (LSD-52)
 USS Rushmore (LSD-47)
 USS San Diego (LPD-22)
 USS Tripoli (LHA-7)
 USS Boxer (LHD-4)
 USS Essex (LHD-2)
 USS Makin Island (LHD-8)
 USS Anchorage (LPD-23)
 USS Somerset (LPD-25)

Littoral Combat Ship Squadron 1 (LCSRON-1) (NB San Diego, CA) 

 USS Freedom (LCS-1)
 USS Independence (LCS-2)
 USS Fort Worth (LCS-3)
 USS Coronado (LCS-4)
 USS Jackson (LCS-6)
 USS Montgomery (LCS-8)
 USS Gabrielle Giffords (LCS-10)
 USS Omaha (LCS-12)
 USS Manchester (LCS-14)
 USS Tulsa (LCS-16)
 USS Charleston (LCS-18)
 USS Cincinnati (LCS-20)
 USS Kansas City (LCS-22)

Mine Countermeasures Squadron 3 (MCMRON-3) (NB San Diego, CA) 

 USS Ardent (MCM-12)
 USS Champion (MCM-4)

Submarine Squadron 1 (SUBRON-1) (NS Pearl Harbor, HI) 

 USS Charlotte (SSN-766)
 USS Greenville (SSN-772)
 USS Texas (SSN-775)
 USS Hawaii (SSN-776)
 USS North Carolina (SSN-777)
 USS Missouri (SSN-780)
 USS Mississippi (SSN-782)
 USS Illinois (SSN-786)

Submarine Squadron 7 (SUBRON 7) (NS Pearl Harbor, HI) 

 USS Chicago (SSN-721)
 USS Jefferson City (SSN-759)
 USS Springfield (SSN-761)
 USS Santa Fe (SSN-763)
 USS Tucson (SSN-770)
 USS Columbia (SSN-771)
 USS Cheyenne (SSN-773)

Submarine Squadron 17 (SUBRON-17) (NB Kitsap–Bangor, WA) 

 USS Henry M. Jackson (SSBN-730)
 USS Alabama (SSBN-731)
 USS Nevada (SSBN-733)
 USS Pennsylvania (SSBN-735)
 USS Kentucky (SSBN-737)
 USS Nebraska (SSBN-739)
 USS Maine (SSBN-741)

Submarine Squadron 19 (SUBRON-19) (NB Kitsap–Bangor, WA) 

 USS Bremerton (SSN-698)
 USS Jacksonville (SSN-699)
 USS Olympia (SSN-717)
 USS Louisville (SSN-724)
 USS Ohio (SSGN-726)
 USS Michigan (SSGN-727)
 USS Louisiana (SSBN-743)

Submarine Development Squadron 5 (SUBDEVRON-5) (NB Kitsap–Bremerton, WA) 

 USS Seawolf (SSN-21)
 USS Connecticut (SSN-22)
 USS Jimmy Carter (SSN-23) (NB Kitsap–Bangor, WA)

Submarine Squadron 11 (SUBRON-11) (NB Point Loma, CA) 

 USS Alexandria (SSN-757)
 USS Scranton (SSN-756)
 USS Hampton (SSN-767)
 USS Indianapolis (SSN-697)

Patrol and Reconnaissance Wing 10 (PATWING-10) (NAS Whidbey Island, WA) 

 Patrol Squadron 1 (VP-1)
 Patrol Squadron 4 (VP-4)
 Patrol Squadron 9 (VP-9)
 Patrol Squadron 40 (VP-40)
 Patrol Squadron 46 (VP-46)
 Patrol Squadron 47 (VP-47)
 Patrol Squadron Special Unit 2 (VPU-2) (MCAS Kaneohe Bay, HI)
 Unmanned Patrol Squadron 11 (VUP-11) 
 Fleet Air Reconnaissance Squadron 1 (VQ-1)

Airborne Command Control Logistics Wing 

 Fleet Logistics Multi-Mission Squadron 30 (VRM-30) (NAS North Island, CA)

United States Seventh Fleet (CFA Yokosuka, Japan) 

 USS Emory S. Land (AS-39) (NB Guam, Guam)
 USS Frank Cable (AS-40) (NB Guam, Guam)

Carrier Strike Group 5 (CSG-5) (CFA Yokosuka, Japan) 
USS Ronald Reagan (CVN-76)
USS Antietam (CG-54)
USS Chancellorsville (CG-62)
USS Shiloh (CG-67)
Destroyer Squadron 15 (DESRON-15) 
USS Barry (DDG-52)
USS Curtis Wilbur (DDG-54)
USS John S. McCain (DDG-56)
USS Benfold (DDG-65)
USS Milius (DDG-69)
USS McCampbell (DDG-85)
USS Mustin (DDG-89)
Carrier Air Wing 5 (CVW-5) (NAF Atsugi, Japan)
Strike Fighter Squadron 27 (VFA-27) (MCAS Iwakuni, Japan)
Strike Fighter Squadron 102 (VFA-102) (MCAS Iwakuni, Japan)
Strike Fighter Squadron 115 (VFA-115) (MCAS Iwakuni, Japan)
Strike Fighter Squadron 195 (VFA-195) (MCAS Iwakuni, Japan)
Carrier Airborne Early Warning Squadron 125 (VAW-125) (MCAS Iwakuni, Japan)
Electronic Attack Squadron 141 (VAQ-141) (MCAS Iwakuni, Japan)
Fleet Logistics Support Squadron 30, Detachment 5 (VRC-30 Det. 5) (MCAS Iwakuni, Japan)
Helicopter Sea Combat Squadron 12 (HSC-12)
Helicopter Maritime Strike Squadron 77

Expeditionary Strike Group 7 (ESG-7) (CFA Sasebo, Japan) 

USS Blue Ridge (LCC-19) (CFA Yokosuka, Japan)
USS America (LHA-6)
USS Green Bay (LPD-20)
USS New Orleans (LPD-18)
USS Germantown (LSD-42)
USS Ashland (LSD-48)

Mine Countermeasures Squadron 7 (MCMRON-7) (USFA Sasebo, Japan) 
USS Patriot (MCM-7)
USS Pioneer (MCM-9)
USS Warrior (MCM-10)
USS Chief (MCM-14)

Submarine Squadron 15 (SUBRON-15) (NB Guam, Guam) 

 USS Key West (SSN-722)
 USS Oklahoma City (SSN-723)
 USS Topeka (SSN-754)
 USS Asheville (SSN-758)

United States Fleet Forces Command (NSA Hampton Roads, VA)

United States Second Fleet (NSA Hampton Roads, VA)

Carrier Strike Group 2 (CSG-2) (NS Norfolk, VA) 

 USS George H.W. Bush (CVN-77)
 USS Philippine Sea (CG-58)
 USS Vella Gulf (CG-72)
 Destroyer Squadron 22 (DESRON-22)
USS Mitscher (DDG-57)
 USS Laboon (DDG-58)
 USS Mahan (DDG-72)
 USS Cole (DDG-67)
USS Bulkeley (DDG-84)
Carrier Air Wing 7 (CVW-7) (NAS Oceana, VA)
Strike Fighter Squadron 143 (VFA-143)
Strike Fighter Squadron 103 (VFA-103)
Strike Fighter Squadron 86 (VFA-86)
Strike Fighter Squadron 25 (VFA-25)
Electronic Attack Squadron 140 (VAQ-140) (NAS Whidbey Island, WA)
Carrier Airborne Early Warning Squadron 121 (VAW-121) (NS Norfolk, VA)
Helicopter Sea Combat Squadron 5 (HSC-5) (NS Norfolk, VA)
Helicopter Maritime Strike Squadron 79 (HSM-79) (NAS Jacksonville, FL)
Fleet Logistics Support Squadron 40, Detachment 3 (VRC-40 Det. 3) (NS Norfolk, VA)

Carrier Strike Group 8 (CSG-8) (NS Norfolk, VA) 

 USS Harry S. Truman (CVN-75)
 USS Normandy (CG-60)
 USS Anzio (CG-68)
 Destroyer Squadron 28 (DESRON-28)
USS Ramage (DDG-61)
USS Bainbridge (DDG-96)
 USS Farragut (DDG-99)
USS Forrest Sherman (DDG-98)
USS Gravely (DDG-107)
USS Jason Dunham (DDG-109)
 Carrier Air Wing 1 (CVW-1) (NAS Oceana, VA)
Strike Fighter Squadron 11 (VFA-11)
Strike Fighter Squadron 81 (VFA-81)
Strike Fighter Squadron 34 (VFA-34)
Strike Fighter Squadron 211 (VFA-211)
Carrier Airborne Early Warning Squadron 126 (VAW-126) (NS Norfolk, VA)
Electronic Attack Squadron 137 (VAQ-137) (NAS Whidbey Island, WA)
Fleet Logistics Support Squadron 40, Detachment 2 (VRC-40, Det. 2) (NS Norfolk, VA)
Helicopter Sea Combat Squadron 11 (HSC-11) (NS Norfolk, VA)
Helicopter Maritime Strike Squadron 72 (HSM-72) (NAS Jacksonville, FL)

Carrier Strike Group 10 (CSG-10) (NS Norfolk, VA) 

 USS Dwight D. Eisenhower (CVN-69)
 USS San Jacinto (CG-56)
 USS Monterrey (CG-61)
 Destroyer Squadron 26 (DESRON-26)
 USS Stout (DDG-55)
 USS McFaul (DDG-74)
 USS Oscar Austin (DDG-79)
 USS Truxtun (DDG-103)
 USS James E. Williams (DDG-95)
 Carrier Air Wing 3 (CVW-3) (NAS Oceana, VA)
Strike Fighter Squadron 32 (VFA-32)
Strike Fighter Squadron 83 (VFA-83) 
 Strike Fighter Squadron 105 (VFA-105)
Strike Fighter Squadron 131 (VFA-131)
Carrier Airborne Early Warning Squadron 123 (VAW-123) (NS Norfolk, VA)
Electronic Attack Squadron 130 (VAQ-130) (NAS Whidbey Island, WA)
Fleet Logistics Support Squadron 40, Detachment 4 (VRC-40 Det. 4) (NS Norfolk, VA)
Helicopter Sea Combat Squadron 7 (HSC-7) (NS Norfolk, VA)
Helicopter Maritime Strike Squadron 74 (HSM-74) (NAS Jacksonville, FL)

Carrier Strike Group 12 (CSG-12) (NS Norfolk, VA) 

 USS Gerald R. Ford (CVN-78)
 USS Leyte Gulf (CG-55)
 USS Gettysburg (CG-64)
 Destroyer Squadron 2 (DESRON-2)
USS Arleigh Burke (DDG-51)
 USS Winston S. Churchill (DDG-81)
 USS Mason (DDG-87)
 USS Nitze (DDG-94)
 USS Gonzalez (DDG-66)
 Carrier Air Wing 8 (CVW-8) (NAS Oceana, VA)
Strike Fighter Squadron 37 (VFA-37)
Strike Fighter Squadron 97 (VFA-97)
Strike Fighter Squadron 213 (VFA-213)
Carrier Airborne Early Warning Squadron 124 (VAW-124) (NS Norfolk, VA)
Electronic Attack Squadron 131 (VAQ-131) (NAS Whidbey Island, VA)
Fleet Logistics Support Squadron 40, Detachment 2 (VRC-40 Det. 2) (NS Norfolk, VA)
Helicopter Sea Combat Squadron 9 (HSC-9) (NS Norfolk, VA)
 Helicopter Maritime Strike Squadron 70 (HSM-70) (NAS Jacksonville, FL)

Surface Squadron 14 (SURFRON-14) (NS Mayport, FL) 

 USS Hué City (CG-66)
 USS Vicksburg (CG-69)
 USS The Sullivans (DDG-68)
 USS Lassen (DDG-82)
 USS Thomas Hunder (DDG-116)
 USS Paul Ignatius (DDG-117)
 USS Delbert D. Black (DDG-119)
 USS Zephyr (PC-8)
 USS Shamal (PC-13)
 USS Tornado (PC-14)

Expeditionary Strike Group 2 (ESG-2) (NS Norfolk, VA) 

 USS Wasp (LHD-1)
 USS Kearsarge (LHD-3)
 USS Bataan (LHD-5)
 USS Iwo Jima (LHD-7) (NS Mayport, FL)
 USS San Antonio (LPD-17) 
 USS Mesa Verde (LPD-19)
 USS New York (LPD-21) (NS Mayport, FL)
 USS Arlington (LPD-24)
 USS Whidbey Island (LSD-41) (NAB Little Creek, VA)
 USS Fort McHenry (LSD-43) (NS Mayport, FL)
 USS Gunston Hall (LSD-44) (NAB Little Creek, VA)
 USS Carter Hall (LSD-50) (NAB Little Creek, VA)
 USS Tortuga (LSD-46) (NAB Little Creek, VA)

Littoral Combat Ship Squadron 2 (LCSRON-2) (NS Mayport, FL) 

 USS Milwaukee (LCS-5)
 USS Detroit (LCS-7)
 USS Little Rock (LCS-9)
 USS Sioux City (LCS-11)
 USS Wichita (LCS-13)
 USS Billings (LCS-15)
 USS Indianapolis (LCS-17)
 USS St. Louis (LCS-19)

Submarine Squadron 6 (SUBRON-6) (NS Norfolk, VA) 

 USS Helena (SSN-725)
 USS Newport News (SSN-750)
 USS Albany (SSN-753)
 USS Boise (SSN-764)
 USS Montpelier (SSN-765)
 USS California (SSN-781)

Submarine Squadron 4 (SUBRON-4) (NSB New London, CT) 

 USS Hartford (SSN-768)
 USS Virginia (SSN-774)
 USS New Hampshire (SSN-778)
 USS New Mexico (SSN-779)
 USS Missouri (SSN-780)

Submarine Development Squadron 12 (SUBDEVRON-12) (NSB New London, CT) 

 USS Toledo (SSN-769)
 USS Providence (SSN-719)
 USS San Juan (SSN-751)

Submarine Squadron 16 (SUBRON 16) (NSB Kings Bay, GA) 

 USS Florida (SSGN-728)
 USS Georgia (SSGN-729)
 USS Tennessee (SSBN-734)
 USS West Virginia (SSBN-736)

Submarine Squadron 20 (SUBRON 20) (NSB Kings Bay, GA) 

 USS Alaska (SSBN-732)
 USS Maryland (SSBN-738)
 USS Rhode Island (SSBN-740)
 USS Wyoming (SSBN-742)

Patrol and Reconnaissance Wing 11 (PATWING-11) (NAS Jacksonville, FL) 

 Patrol Squadron 5 (VP-5)
 Patrol Squadron 8 (VP-8)
 Patrol Squadron 10 (VP-10)
 Patrol Squadron 16 (VP-16)
 Patrol Squadron 26 (VP-26)
 Patrol Squadron 45 (VP-45)
 Unmanned Patrol Squadron 19 (VUP-19) (Detachment NAS Point Mugu, CA)

Strategic Communications Wing 1 (STRACOMWING-1) (Tinker AFB, OK) 

 Fleet Air Reconnaissance Squadron 3 (VQ-3) (Detachments Travis AFB, CA; Offutt AFB, NE)
 Fleet Air Reconnaissance Squadron 4 (VQ-4) (Detachment NAS Patuxent River, MD)

United States Sixth Fleet (NSA Naples, Italy) 

USS Mount Whitney (LCC-20) (NATO Base Gaeta, Italy)

Destroyer Squadron 60 (DESRON-60) (NS Rota, Spain) 

 USS Carney (DDG-64)
 USS Ross (DDG-71)
 USS Donald Cook (DDG-75)
 USS Porter (DDG-78)
 USS Roosevelt (DDG-80)

United States Fifth Fleet (NSA Bahrain, Bahrain)

Commander Naval Surface Squadron 5 (CNSS-5) (NSA Bahrain, Bahrain) 

 USS Tempest (PC-2) SHIP DECOMMISSIONED 2022
 USS Hurricane (PC-3)
 USS Monsoon (PC-4)
 USS Typhoon (PC-5) SHIP DECOMMISSIONED 2022
 USS Sirocco (PC-6)
 USS Squall (PC-7) SHIP DECOMMISSIONED 2022
 USS Chinook (PC-9)
 USS Firebolt (PC-10) SHIP DECOMMISSIONED 2022
 USS Whirlwind (PC-11) SHIP DECOMMISSIONED 2022
 USS Thunderbolt (PC-12)
 USS Sentry (MCM-3)
 USS Devastator (MCM-6)
 USS Gladiator (MCM-11)
 USS Dexterous (MCM-13)

U.S. Naval Forces Southern Command (NS Mayport, FL)

United States Fourth Fleet

U.S. Fleet Cyber Command (Fort George G. Meade, MD)

United States Tenth Fleet 
Commander, Naval Network Warfare Command (NNWC)
Commanding Officer, Navy Cyber Defense Operations Command (NCDOC)
Commanding Officer, Naval Information Operation Commands (NIOC)
NIOC Suitland (Research, Development, Test & Evaluation)
Combined Task Forces (CTF)

Naval Special Warfare Command (NAB Coronado, CA)
Naval Special Warfare Development Group
Naval Special Warfare Group One
SEAL Teams One, Three, Five and Seven
Naval Special Warfare Group Two (NAB Little Creek, VA)
SEAL Teams Two, Four, Eight, and Ten
Naval Special Warfare Group 3
SDV Teams One and Two
Naval Special Warfare Group Four
Special Boat Team 12 (NAB Coronado, CA)
Special Boat Team 20 (NAB Little Creek, VA)
Special Boat Team 22 (John C. Stennis Space Center, MS)
Naval Special Warfare Group 11
SEAL Teams Seventeen and Eighteen

Naval Network Warfare Command
Naval Information Operations Command (Formerly known as the Naval Security Group)
Naval Information Operations Detachment Fort Meade
Naval Computer and Telecommunications Area Master Station Atlantic
Naval Computer and Telecommunications Station Naples
Naval Computer and Telecommunications Station Sicily
Naval Computer and Telecommunications Station Bahrain
Naval Computer and Telecommunications Area Master Station Atlantic Detachment Hampton Roads
Naval Computer and Telecommunications Area Master Station Atlantic Detachment LaMoure
Naval Computer and Telecommunications Area Master Station Atlantic Detachment Rota
Naval Computer and Telecommunications Area Master Station Atlantic Detachment Souda Bay
Naval Computer and Telecommunications Area Master Station Pacific
Naval Computer and Telecommunications Station Guam
Naval Computer and Telecommunications Station Far East
Naval Space Operations Command

Naval Reserve Force (NSA Hampton Roads, VA)
Naval Air Force Reserve
Fleet Logistics Support Wing
Fleet Logistics Support Squadron 1 (VR-1) (NAF Washington, MD)
Fleet Logistics Support Squadron 51 (VR-51) (MCAS Kaneohe Bay, HI)
Fleet Logistics Support Squadron 53 (VR-53) (NAF Washington, MD)
Fleet Logistics Support Squadron 54 (VR-54) (NAS JRB New Orleans, LA)
Fleet Logistics Support Squadron 55 (VR-55) (NAS Point Mugu, CA)
Fleet Logistics Support Squadron 56 (VR-56) (NAS Oceana, VA)
Fleet Logistics Support Squadron 57 (VR-57) (NAS North Island, CA)
Fleet Logistics Support Squadron 58 (VR-58) (NAS Jacksonville, CA)
Fleet Logistics Support Squadron 59 (VR-59) (NAS JRB Fort Worth, TX)
Fleet Logistics Support Squadron 61 (VR-61) (NAS Whidbey Island, WA)
Fleet Logistics Support Squadron 62 (VR-62) (NAS Jacksonville, FL)
Fleet Logistics Support Squadron 62 (VR-64) (NAES Lakehurst, NJ)
Tactical Support Wing (TSW) (NAS JRB Fort Worth, TX)
Strike Fighter Squadron 204 (VFA-204) (NAS JRB New Orleans, LA)
Electronic Attack Squadron 209 (VAQ-209) (NAS Whidbey Island, WA)
Fighter Squadron Composite 12 (VFC-12) (NAS Oceana, VA)
Fighter Squadron Composite 13 (VFC-13) (NAS Fallon, NV)
Fighter Squadron Composite 111 (VFC-111) (NAS Key West, FL)

Operational Test and Evaluation Force
See Operational Test and Evaluation Force (OPTEVFOR)

Disbandments
Helicopter Wing Reserve (disbanded 31 May 2007, per OPNAV 3111.214, issued 22 May 2006)
Reserve Patrol Wing (disbanded 30 June 2007 as per OPNAV 3111.204, issued 6 April 2006 with Patrol Squadrons reassigned or disbanded)
VP 65, VP 66, and VP 94 disbanded per OPNAV 3111.454, 29 Nov 2005)

References

US Navy directives site at http://doni.daps.dla.mil/OPNAV.aspx 3000 series
US Navy Fleet Chain of Command, via http://dodssp.daps.mil/sndl.htm, dated 12 August 2005
US Navy on GlobalSecurity.org
COMNAVSURFPAC Subordinate Commands
COMNAVSURFLANT Commands

 
Units list